Donald Mark Witherspoon (born September 3, 1963, in Chicago) is an American former sprinter. He joined his high school track team after having success as a cornerback on the football team. In college, he was primarily a 200 m and 400 m runner. As a professional, he competed in the 1992 Summer Olympics, where he tore his achilles tendon.

International competitions

1Did not finish in the semifinals

Personal bests
Outdoor
100 meters – 10.04 (+1.8 m/s, San José 1987)
200 meters – 20.12 (+1.0 m/s, Houston 1989)

References

1963 births
Living people
Track and field athletes from Chicago
American male sprinters
Pan American Games track and field athletes for the United States
Athletes (track and field) at the 1987 Pan American Games
Olympic track and field athletes of the United States
Athletes (track and field) at the 1992 Summer Olympics
World Athletics Indoor Championships medalists
Goodwill Games medalists in athletics
USA Outdoor Track and Field Championships winners
Competitors at the 1990 Goodwill Games